Bridgeport is a neighborhood located in Indianapolis, Marion County, Indiana. It was previously a small village with a post office and stores, but later became part of Indianapolis.

History
Bridgeport was platted in 1831. It was also called West Parkview and Sunnyside. It was an early African-American community in Marion County.

Geography
Bridgeport is located in Wayne Township near the intersection of Bridgeport Road and Washington Street (US 40).

Gallery

References

External links

Neighborhoods in Indianapolis
Former villages in the United States
1831 establishments in Indiana
Populated places established in 1831